The Lawrence Public School in the Lawrenceville neighborhood of  Pittsburgh, Pennsylvania was built in 1872 and served as an elementary school, including instruction in the German language. It was named after Captain James Lawrence, whose last words "Don't give up the ship!" gained famed in the War of 1812.

The school was damaged by a fire in 1912, but was able to be repaired. Reportedly, a crowd of school children danced and cheered as the building burned and its  bell fell from its supports. It closed in 1939, along with the nearby Bayard School and Foster School, when all students were transferred to the new elementary wing of Arsenal Junior High School. The building was sold in 1945 and then used as a warehouse. The school was listed on the National Register of Historic Places in 1986. The two upper floors were destroyed by a fire in 1987 and the building was truncated at the ground floor. Since 2017, it has housed a brewery, Eleventh Hour Brewing.

References

Italianate architecture in Pennsylvania
School buildings completed in 1872
Schools in Pittsburgh
School buildings on the National Register of Historic Places in Pennsylvania
CBSE Delhi
National Register of Historic Places in Pittsburgh
Lawrenceville (Pittsburgh)